Brave 10 (stylized as BRAVE10) is a manga series by Kairi Shimotsuki, serialized in Media Factory's Comic Flapper from 2006 to 2010. The series was resumed on June 15, 2011 and retitled Brave 10 Spiral, better known as Brave 10 S, serialized in Monthly Comic Gene. An anime adaptation by Studio Sakimakura and TMS Entertainment aired from January 2012 to March 2012. The original manga series is licensed by Tokyopop, though no volumes have been released as of 2012. The series is based on the legendary Sanada Ten Braves, a group of ninja that assisted warlord Sanada Yukimura during the Sengoku period of Japan. The series had been licensed for streaming on Crunchyroll.

Plot
The story takes place during the Warring States period, approximately a year before the Battle of Sekigahara. Kirigakure Saizou, an Iga Ninja in search of his life's path, comes across Isanami, a shrine maiden, being attacked by assassins. Isanami, who survived the burning of the Temple by Tokugawa Ieyasu's forces, is traveling to Shinshuu to seek sanctuary with Sanada Yukimura. At the same time, Sanada Yukimura is in the midst of gathering 10 subjects of extraordinary valor, the Sanada Ten Braves, whose combined strength will allow them to alter the course of history. During the course of the continuing battles, the mysterious power hidden within Isanami will awaken soon...

Characters

A ninja who originally came from Iga. His weapon allows him to use "senkou" (flash) that enables him to accelerate. He was rumored to be the "genius" ninja who has never let a single strand of hair of his to be touched. Saizo was a cold, efficient ninja who killed many people, but later changed after he met Isanami, who believed in him. While spending his days with Isanami, he begins to care for her, even harboring some feelings for her. According to Yukimura, Saizo carries the element of light, which he denies because he has taken so many lives.

A priestess Saizo saved in the woods, first seen running from an organization that was trying to kidnap her. After her home was burnt down, Isanami, the only survivor, went to seek refuge by Yukimura. Though she often plays a damsel in distress because of her kushi mitama, she regrets making people hurt because of her and decides to run away. Ana encourages her, reminding her that strength comes in different shapes, boosting her confidence to become one of Yukimura's braves. She harbors feelings for Saizo.
Among the braves, Isanami is the darkness. Later it is revealed that she was the goddess of darkness that took 1000 peoples’ lives, and the only one that can stop her is Saizo.

A ninja who can communicate with animals and is always composed. He often blushes when he's talking to Isanami. His element is grass.

The Lord that gathers the 10 braves. He has a very nonchalant attitude, but his subordinates are all loyal to him, especially Rokuro.
He seems to possess the power to battle by demonstrating the small duel between him and Date Masamune.

The stranded princess from Europe and also Saizo's childhood friend. Because she wishes to return honor to her family, Hanzo is able to trick her and makes her his pawn, forcing her to betray Yukimura and the braves. Her element is ice.

A child that Yukimura met on the way to Kyoto. He excels in traps and bombs. His element was fire. While he was one of the Ten Braves, Yukimura officially adopted him as his son. After his adoption, he is now known as Yukimura Daisuke.

The commander who controls Oushu. He has an eye patch over his right eye and white hair. He once kidnapped Isanami because he wanted to destroy kushi mitama, which was said to be able to quell the chaos in the world. He pays careful attention to Yukimura.

The head of the five Iga ninja. He is faster than Saizo. He chases Isanami because she was the goddess of darkness. Later, due to his greed and arrogance in thinking that he could tame the pure darkness, his right hand was devoured by Isanami. His element is fire, taking the place of Benmaru after his adoption.

An uptight and traditional samurai who excels in sniping. He is loyal to Sanada Yukimura. He loves his guns to the point of naming them one by one. His element is metal.

The head of a band pirates controlling Lake Biwa. He loves drinking sake, women, and his ship. He once rejected the fact that Isanami is a woman because of her small chest. His partner is a black panther named Veronica. His element is lightning.

Miyoshi picked Isanami in Izumo when she was a baby. When he learned about Isanami he became confused with the path of God and went in search of his own god. He thought of Isanami as his own sister and went to great lengths to protect her. He has a monstrous power and muscles that can block shuriken and crush the ground. His element is earth.

Yukimura's most loyal servant. He is able to record and see through anything in his right eye, and he also has the power of sound waves. His element is water.

It was unclear at first whether Kamanosuke was a woman or a man. Kamanosuke wields a large sickle and is able to control wind. Kamanosuke was saved by Isanami from Saizo and after he let him live, he went to follow Saizo to battle him more. He was later chosen by Yukimura to be one of the braves.

A feudal lord of Aizu. He tried to be Yukimura's ally to fight the Tokugawa clan.

A feudal lord of Saweyama. He supported Mitsunari to form an alliance with Yukimura.

Media

Manga

Anime
On November 15, 2011, an anime adaptation was announced its official YouTube channel. The series was produced by TMS Entertainment and directed by Kiyoko Sayama. Mamiko Ikeda is in charge of the scripts, Yukiko Ban designed the characters, and Seikou Nagaoka composed the music. The anime premiered on Tokyo MX from January 8 to March 27, 2012. The anime is licensed by Crunchyroll for streaming outside of Asia. On January 5, 2012, NIS America announced that it had acquired the home video rights to the Brave 10 television anime series and released it on DVD on October 8, 2013. Discotek Media released the series on Blu-ray on February 23, 2021.

Radio

There is a Web Radio program called " 柿原徹也・ 森川智之の BRAVE10 on the radio "

Sometimes, guests from the Japanese anime cast are featured on the radio chat.

The " 柿原徹也・ 森川智之の BRAVE10 on the radio " program is also released on DVD and Mobacon format in Japan. 
There are five volumes being released. The first volume was released on January 27, 2012 in Japan. People who pre-ordered the first volume received special photos from the Japanese voice acting radio cast.

References

External links
 Official site 
 

2006 manga
2011 manga
2012 anime television series debuts
Action anime and manga
Discotek Media
Historical anime and manga
Media Factory manga
Kadokawa Dwango franchises
Seinen manga
Tokyo MX original programming
TMS Entertainment